Fanor Mondragón Pérez is a Colombian chemist, professor and researcher, recognized for his research on the impact of fossil fuels on the environment. Member of the Colombian Academy of Exact, Physical and Natural Sciences, during his career he has won various awards, such as the Francisco Antonio Zea University Merit Medal and the Fulbright Research Grant, among others. He is a professor emeritus of the University of Antioquia and an ambassador for Hokkaidō University in Colombia.

Education and career 
Mondragón was born in Bolívar, Valle del Cauca. He studied in Medellín and graduated as a chemical engineer from the University of Antioquia in 1974. Later, he joined the Department of Chemistry at the University of Antioquia as a teacher and researcher. He obtained a scholarship from Japan's Ministry of Education, through the Japanese embassy in Colombia, to do his postgraduate studies at Hokkaidō University in Sapporo. In Hokkaido he completed his master's (1980-1981) and doctorate (1981-1984) degrees with professor Koji Ouchi, working on the structure and chemical reactions of coal. Its doctoral committee included Akira Suzuki, winner of the Nobel Prize in Chemistry.

Upon finishing his studies, Mondragón returned to the University of Antioquia and in 1984 took over the leadership of the Chemical Group for Energy Resources and the Environment (QUIREMA), founded by professor Gustavo Quintero in 1982. He has held various positions at his alma mater, such as teacher, coordinator of the doctorate in chemical sciences and vice-chancellor for research. During his time as vice-chancellor, he visited the Colombian embassy in Korea to promote relations between the universities of both countries. He was appointed professor emeritus of the University of Antioquia in September 2019.

Since 2021 Mondragón has been a full member of the Colombian Academy of Exact, Physical and Natural Sciences,</ref> where he coordinates the permanent commission on science, technology and innovative society. He served as president of the Ibero-American Federation of Catalysis Societies (FISOCAT) between 2016 and 2020. In November 2018, professor Kiyoharu Tadanaga visited the University of Antioquia to present Mondragón with the certificate of his appointment as ambassador of Hokkaidō University in Colombia. In 2020, he was elected to the board of directors of the non-profit association Ruta N.

His work has focused on hydrocarbons, their effect on the environment, and on sustainable alternatives to fossil fuels. Mondragón has received various recognitions during his academic career. Mondragón collaborated with Colombian senator Iván Darío Agudelo in the creation and preparation of a bill for the creation of the Ministry of Science and Technology in Colombia.

Selected publications 

 Alejandro Molina, Fanor Mondragon. 1998. Reactivity of coal gasification with steam and CO2. Fuel; 77(15): 1831-1839. doi: 10.1016/S0016-2361(98)00123-9
 Germán Sierra Gallego, Fanor Mondragón, Joel Barrault, Jean-Michel Tatibouët, Catherine Batiot-Dupeyrat. 2006. CO2 reforming of CH4 over La–Ni based perovskite precursors. Applied Catalysis A: General;  311:164-171. doi: 10.1016/j.apcata.2006.06.024

 Carlos Enrique Daza, Jaime Gallego, Fanor Mondragón, Sonia Moreno, Rafael Molina. 2010. High stability of Ce-promoted Ni/Mg–Al catalysts derived from hydrotalcites in dry reforming of methane. Fuel; 89(3): 592-603. doi: 10.1016/j.fuel.2009.10.010
 German Sierra Gallego, Catherine Batiot-Dupeyrat, Joel Barrault, Elizabeth Florez, Fanor Mondragon. 2008. Applied Catalysis A: General; 334(1–2): 251-258. doi: 10.1016/j.apcata.2007.10.010
 Fanor Mondragon, Fabio Rincon, Ligia Sierra, Jaime Escobar, Jose Ramirez, John Fernandez. 1990. New perspectives for coal ash utilization: synthesis of zeolitic materials. Fuel; 69(2): 263-266. doi: 10.1016/0016-2361(90)90187-U.

Awards and recognitions 

 Research Award of the University of Antioquia (1999)
 Beca de Investigación de la Comisión Fulbright de Estados Unidos
 Merit Medal Francisco Antonio Zea
 Scholarship from the Education Ministry of Japan for postgraduate studies
 Scopus Award 2013
 Emeritus Researcher of the Colombian Ministry of Science, Technology and Innovation

Source:

References

External links 
 Official website of the University of Antioquia

University of Antioquia alumni
Hokkaido University alumni
Colombian chemists
Academic staff of the University of Antioquia
Year of birth missing (living people)
Living people
Fulbright alumni